The Amazing Race Asia 2 is the second season of The Amazing Race Asia, a reality television game show based on the American series The Amazing Race. The second season of the show features ten teams of two with a pre-existing relationship, in a race around the world to win US$100,000.

This season premiered on 22 November 2007 at 9:00 p.m. (UTC+8) and ended on 14 February 2008 at 9:00 p.m. (UTC+8).

Singaporean gym buddies Adrian Yap and Collin Low were the winners of this season. Adrian Yap was the first contestant with a disability to participate & win any edition of The Amazing Race.

Production

Development and filming

The second season of The Amazing Race Asia covered  (the longest route to date of The Amazing Race Asia) in 24 days racing across 4 continents, including the first time an Amazing Race franchise visited the Czech Republic, a nation that had not been visited by the original version at the time of air (the nation would later be visited in the 15th season, in 2009). The show adopted newer rules from the original American version, such as the non-elimination penalty where the team who checked in last must make it to first place in the next leg or else incur the 30 minute penalty. It was also noted that the production of this season had run into the production of The Amazing Race 12 in an unknown airport. Production made the show more competitive by imposing more self-driving and reducing the chance of teams being bunched up on the same airplane flight.

This season had two different penalties for coming in last on a non-elimination leg. Edwin & Monica were marked for elimination for coming in last on the first leg, and Henry & Terri were stripped of all their money and had to begin the next leg with no money after coming in last on the seventh leg. Racers were not told that the original non-elimination penalty was still applicable. This twist led to an argument between Henry and host Allan Wu at the Seoul Pit Stop, when the former was unwilling to give up his team's money. In the following leg, the penalty reverted to the "marked for elimination" penalty after Terri & Henry finished last consecutively.

Marketing
The second season of the show had six official sponsors: Aviva, Caltex, Nokia Nseries, Sony Electronics Asia Pacific, Bintan Lagoon Resort, and Standard Chartered Bank. The sponsors played a major role in the series by providing prizes and integrating their products into various tasks.

Casting
This season featured 10 teams chosen from 2500 applicants, including racers from the original American series. Final applications were accepted 13 April 2007 (two weeks after the original deadline). This season was also open to the Japanese, who were ineligible for Season 1. Final interviews were held sometime in April or May 2007. Filming took place sometime in June or July 2007.

Broadcasting
Two special episodes acted as bookends for this season; the first subtitled "Racers Revealed" was shown three weeks before the season premiere while the second, "Memories" aired one week after the season finale. The former contained racer introductions and production insight into the casting process. The latter featured the racers sharing their favorite memories and highlights of the season, similar to that of Season 1.

Cast
This season's cast included reunited siblings, childhood friends, and dating couples. Notably, Adrian is the first hearing-impaired contestant in Amazing Race history. It also featured a large number of local media personalities or their relatives. Monica Lo represented Toronto, Ontario, Canada and won the 1997 Miss Chinese International Pageant, while Paula Taylor is a Channel [V] VJ. Vanessa & Pamela are the sisters of famous Malaysian singer Vince Chong. Kinaryosih is a famous Indonesian movie actress and model, who has also won a Citra Award for Best Supporting Actress in 2006. Sophie is a filmmaker for the Discovery Channel, as well as a correspondent for the Asian Film Festival. Marc Saw Nelson is a model and host of the Philippine sports show Sports Unlimited, while Rovilson Fernandez is a host for another similar show, Gameplan and an editor for Maxim Philippines.

This season features three non-Asians. One is Henry, a former US Navy Petty Officer, who raced with his Filipina wife Trinidad (better known as Terri). The other is Aurelia, a Frenchwoman residing in Hong Kong who raced with her Singaporean ex-housemate Sophie, while Brett is of Australian nationality.

Henry Reed died on May 21, 2013 at the age of 53.

Marc & Rovilson became the first team to win eight legs in a season, which was a record set for winning the most legs in a single season, and would later be matched by the winning team Rachel & Dave of twentieth season of the original American version, and Tom & Tyler and Ashleigh & Amanda respectively from the fourth and fifth seasons of the Australian version.

Future appearances
Paula Taylor appeared on the first leg of The Amazing Race Asia 3 as a Pit Stop greeter in Chiang Mai.

Results
The following teams participated in the season, with their relationships at the time of filming. Placements are listed in finishing order.
A  placement with a dagger indicates that the team was eliminated. 
A  placement with a double-dagger indicates that the team was the last to arrive at a pit stop in a non-elimination leg.
An  placement indicates that the team was marked for elimination; if the team did not place 1st in the next leg, they would receive a 30-minute penalty.
An  placement indicates that the team had to relinquish all of their money and were not allotted money for the next leg.
Italicised results indicate the position of the team at the midpoint of a two-episode leg.
A  indicates that the team won a Fast Forward.
A  indicates that the teams encountered an Intersection.
A  indicates that the team chose to use the Yield, and a  indicates the team who received it.

Notes

Episode title quotes
Episode titles are often taken from quotes made by the racers.
"I'm A Box of Chocolate" – Terri
"This Is The Fun Bus" – Rovilson
"I Don't Think I Wanna Be Rich" – Henry
"It's A Really Tough Way To End" – Sophie
"Sometimes It's Right In Your Face" – Natasha
"We Choose To Yield Magnum, P.I." – Henry
"Did That Hit Your Head?" – Paula
"Can You Send Them To Spain" – Rovilson
"So We're Going To The Pit Stop?" – Vanessa
"Apparently Driving Like A Looney Over Here Is Fine For Them" – Diane
"This Is Embarrassing, There's A Guy Running Faster Than Us"  – Marc
"I Haven't Seen So Much Dung In My Life" – Collin
"This Is Such An Amazing, Amazing Experience That No One Should Miss" – Collin

Prizes
Individual prizes were awarded to the first team to complete certain legs.

Leg 1 – Nokia N95 and N73 mobile phones, one for each team member.
Leg 2 –  credit card issued by Standard Chartered Bank for each team member.
Leg 3 – A one year's supply of fuel sponsored by Caltex.
Leg 4 – A Sony Handycam SR7 for each team member.
Leg 7 – US$5000 credit card issued by Standard Chartered Bank for each team member.
Leg 8 – A Sony Handycam SR7 for each team member.
Leg 9 – Nokia N95 and N73 mobile phones, one for each team member.
Leg 11 – A safari trip to South Africa with whale watching, courtesy of Caltex.
Leg 12 –

Race summary

Leg 1 (Singapore → Philippines)

Airdate: 22 November 2007
Singapore (Singapore River Mouth) (Starting Line)
Singapore (Asian Civilisations Museum)
Singapore (Mount Faber – Merlion Statue)
Singapore (Suntec City – Suntec Towers) 
 Singapore (Changi Airport) to Manila, Philippines (Ninoy Aquino International Airport)
Pasay (ASEAN Promenade Park – CCP Complex)
Manila (Quiapo – Plaza Miranda)
Manila (Intramuros – Fort Santiago) 

This season's first Detour was a choice between Dare or Stair. In Stair, teams had to climb up 45 floors to the rooftop of Tower 3 and then descend and head to Tower 4 and again climb up 45 floors before receiving their next clue.

Additional tasks
For their first task, teams received a postcard that depicted one of Singapore's many national icons and had to search for a specific taxi cab near the Asian Civilisations Museum with the souvenir from their postcard to receive their next clue from the taxi driver.
Atop Mount Faber, teams picked up a Nokia N95 phone and used its GPS system to guide their taxi driver to their next location: Suntec City.
At Plaza Miranda, teams had to eat eight balut before receiving their next clue from the egg seller.

Leg 2 (Philippines)

Airdate: 29 November 2007
 Pasay (Green Star Bus Terminal) to Pila, Laguna (Pila Municipal Center)
 Pila (Rivera Street Rice Paddy Field)
Manila (Malate – Caltex Star Mart)
 Manila (Ermita Church – Nuestra Señora de Guía Children's Center)
  Manila (Santa Cruz – Carriedo Station)
Manila (Paco – Paco Park) 

In this season's first Roadblock, one team member had to choose a carabao and then lead it to plough a muddy rice paddy in a slalom pattern past a series of posts with Amazing Race before returning to the start to receive their next clue. Team members were taught beforehand some common vocal commands to help control their carabao but had to start over if they asked for help.

This leg's Detour was a choice between Heel or Wheel. In Heel, teams had to match 250 pairs of shoes from a messy pile to receive their next clue from a shopkeeper. In Wheel, teams had to choose a work station and fully assemble a bicycle with just the equipment and parts provided to get their next clue.

Additional task
At the Caltex Star Mart, teams had to load four boxes of donations into a marked jeepney. Teams then had to ride in the jeepney to deliver the donated boxes to an orphanage in Ermita Church before receiving their next clue.

Leg 3 (Philippines → Hong Kong → New Zealand)

Airdate: 6 December 2007
 Manila (Ninoy Aquino International Airport) to Chek Lap Kok, Hong Kong, China (Hong Kong International Airport)
Central and Western District (Central Piers)
Wan Chai District (Causeway Bay – Standard Chartered Bank)
 Chek Lap Kok (Hong Kong International Airport) to Auckland, New Zealand (Auckland Airport)
Manukau City (Howick Historical Village)
 Auckland (Auckland Harbour Bridge)
 Auckland (Birkenhead Leisure Centre or Lake Pupuke)
Matakana (Ascension Vineyard)
Karaka (Spookers Haunted House – Old Nurses' Hostel) 
Karaka (Spookers Haunted House – Forest of Fear) 

In this leg's Roadblock, one team member had to perform a  bungee jump from the Auckland Harbour Bridge to receive their next clue.

This leg's Detour was a choice between two adventure sports, Wall or Waka. In Wall, teams had to head to the Birkenhead Leisure Centre, where each team member had to climb the rock wall once to retrieve one flag each. Then, one team member had to climb the wall again to grab their next clue. In Waka, teams had to go to Lake Pupuke and paddle a traditional waka boat around the lake to collect three flags and then return to receive their next clue.

Additional tasks
At the Standard Chartered Bank, teams had to count the Hong Kong currency on their tables, which included a large pile of notes and also a large stack of coins, and calculate the correct amount to receive their next clue. Each table had a unique amount of money.
At the Howick Historical Village, teams had to use a Sony Cyber-shot digital camera to photograph three objects and then present their pictures to the judge at the Howick Courthouse to receive their next clue.
At Spookers Haunted House, teams had to enter the Old Nurses' Hostel, rumored to be haunted and filled with scary characters, and complete the walk through the haunted house to receive their next clue.

Leg 4 (New Zealand)

Airdate: 13 December 2007
Tirau (Caltex Gas Station)
Rotorua (Okere Falls Scenic Reserve)
Rotorua (Lake Tikitapu)
 Rotorua (Hell's Gate)
 Rotorua (Whakarewarewa – Te Puia)
Rotorua (Whakarewarewa – Pohutu Geyser) 

This leg's Detour was a choice between Flax or Stick. In Flax, teams had to weave traditional Māori headbands called a tipare out of flax plants to the satisfaction of the demonstrators to receive their next clue. In Stick, teams had to master a traditional Māori stick game called the titi torea in which team members had to pass specially carved sticks to each other in a particular rhythm without dropping the sticks to receive their next clue.

Additional tasks
At the Caltex gas station, teams had to refuel their cars and pay for their fuel using a special Caltex card before receiving their next clue from the cashier.
At Okere Falls Scenic Reserve, teams had to perform white water sledging in the cold rapids before retrieving their next clue.
At Lake Tikitapu, teams had to successfully drive a 450-horsepower Agrojet Boat through a course, with one racer serving as the driver and the other as the navigator, to receive their next clue.

Leg 5 (New Zealand → Japan → South Korea)

Airdates: 20 and 27 December 2007
 Auckland (Auckland Airport) to Tokyo, Japan (Narita International Airport)
 Narita (Narita Airport Terminal 2·3 Station) to Tokyo (Chiyoda – Tokyo Station or Minato – Hamamatsuchō Station)
Tokyo (Minato – Shiba Park)
Tokyo (Chūō – Sony Building)
Tokyo (Shibuya – Shibuya Mark City)
 Tokyo (Shibuya – Shōtō Restaurant or Dry Cleaner 24 and Kimono Rental AKI)
 Tokyo (Minato – Icebar Tokyo)
 (Bullet Train) Tokyo (Minato – Shinagawa Station) to Fukuoka (Hakata Station)
Fukuoka (International Congress Center) 
 Fukuoka (Hakata Port Ferry Terminal) to Busan, South Korea (Busan Harbour Pier 1)
Busan (Jongro Academy)
Busan (Jagalchi Market)  
Busan (Dongbaek Island – Nurimaru APEC House )
 Busan (Yongdusan Park)
Busan (Beomeosa Temple) 

This leg's first Detour was a choice between You Catch It or You Cart It. In You Catch It, teams had to participate in the traditional game of goldfish scooping by using paddles made of rice paper, which disintegrate very easily when immersed in water, to scoop up 40 goldfish and receive their next clue. In You Cart It, teams had to locate Dry Cleaner 24 and collect a yukata, which they had to deliver to Kimono Rental AKI to receive their next clue.

In this leg's first Roadblock, one team member had to enter the  Icebar Tokyo and decipher an ice block puzzle by arranging lettered ice blocks to form the name of one of the biggest cities in Japan (Fukuoka) to receive their next clue.

This leg's second Detour was a choice between Slither or Deliver. In Slither, teams had to find a marked fish tank filled with octopus at the Jagalchi Fish Market. Each team member then had to retrieve one 100-year-old Korean coin from the bottom of the tank before receiving their next clue. In Deliver, teams had to deliver two meals each on their heads to three different addresses to receive their next clue.

In this leg's second Roadblock, teams had to find a gatekeeper at Yongdusan Park. Then, one team member, regardless of who performed the first Roadblock, had to then use a key to open one of the locks to receive their next clue from the gatekeeper. Racers would have to start over if they broke their key.

Additional tasks
At Shiba Park, teams had to take a marked rickshaw and direct their guide to the Sony Building to receive their next clue.
At the Sony Building, teams had to convince a local to sing the traditional Japanese folk song "Sakura" with one team member while their partner recorded them on a Sony HD Handycam. If they sung the lyrics correctly, the staff at Sony would hand teams their next clue.
After completing the "Sakura" task, teams received a Sony Cyber-shot digital camera which had a picture of a cosplaying girl. Teams had to find the person in their picture at Shibuya Mark City to receive their next clue.
At Jongro Academy, each team member had to use taekwondo techniques to break three boards by kicking them before receiving their next clue from the taekwondo master.
At Jagalchi Market, teams had to find the Golden Pig statue, where they would find the Yield and their next clue.
At the Yield, Terri & Henry used the Yield against Marc & Rovilson. But the latter already passed the Yield and were therefore unaffected.

Leg 6 (South Korea)

Airdate: 3 January 2008
Anseong (Seoil Farm) 
Suwon (Woncheon Resort)
Yongin (Korean Folk Village) 
Seoul (Olympic Park – Peace Plaza) 

In this leg's Roadblock, one team member had to search under the lids of 1,500 soybean jars until they found one containing their next clue. In addition, one of the jars contained the clue plus a 50 bonus from Standard Chartered.

This leg's Detour was a choice between Too Ho or Too Heavy. In Too Heavy, teams had to deliver 30 logs using a jige to a woman in the village before receiving their next clue.

Additional task
At Woncheon Resort, teams had to search among many swan boats for a marked one, which they had to paddle to an offshore buoy to retrieve their next clue.

Leg 7 (South Korea → Germany → Czech Republic)

Airdate: 10 January 2008
 Seoul (Incheon International Airport) to Frankfurt, Germany (Frankfurt Airport)
Frankfurt (Old Opera House)
 Frankfurt (Frankfurt (Main) Hauptbahnhof) to Prague, Czech Republic (Praha Hlavní Nádraží)
Prague (Charles Bridge – Statue of St. Vitus)
Prague (Karlova Street  – Little Shop, Building Number 3)
Prague (Old Town Square – Kinský Palace)
 Prague (Hotel U Prince)
 Prague (Praha Hlavní Nádraží) to Beroun (Beroun Railway Station )
Beroun (Town Square)
 Nižbor (Rückl Crystal or Archery Range)
Karlštejn (Karlštejn Castle) 

In this leg's Roadblock, one team member had to don a full suit of knight's armour and then look for a "damsel in distress", who was standing on a balcony at the Hotel U Prince. Once team members found her, they had to tie a key to a rope which the "damsel" would exchange for their next clue.

This leg's Detour was a choice between Blow or Bow. In Blow, teams had to travel to Rückl Crystal, where each team member had to carve a star design on the bottom of a glass cup to receive their next clue. In Bow, each team member had to hit a red-and-yellow coloured target using a traditional crossbow to receive their next clue.

Additional tasks
At the Charles Bridge, teams had to search the bridge for a "holey" statue to find their next clue.
At the town square in Beroun, teams had to search among several people with Nokia N95 mobile phones for the one with their team's picture. Teams would then watch a video message from home before receiving their next clue.

Additional note
Once in Beroun, teams had to find a marked Škoda Favorit car that would serve as their transportation for the rest of the leg.

Leg 8 (Czech Republic)

Airdate: 17 January 2008
 Karlštejn (Karlštejn Train Station ) to Prague (Praha Hlavní Nádraží)
 Prague (Újezd Station to Petřín Hill Observation Tower)
 Prague (Střelecký Island to Vltava Riverbank)
Prague (Prague Castle) 
Prague (Ice Arena Letňany)
 Prague (Statue of St. Wenceslas, Museum of Communism, Estates Theatre, and Statue of Josef Mánes or Hostinec U Váhy and Admiral Botel)
Prague (Plavecký Stadion Podolí) 
Prague (Vrtbovská Garden) 

This leg's Detour for the Intersected teams was a choice between Snap or Roll. In Snap, the Intersected teams had to take photos of three historic monuments using a Sony Cyber-shot camera (Statue of St. Wenceslas at Wenceslas Square, Stalin Statue in the Museum of Communism, and Estates Theatre) and show these photographs to the personnel positioned in front of the Statue of Josef Mánes to receive their next clue. In Roll, the Intersected teams had to locate Hostinec U Váhy, collect two  beer kegs, and roll them over to the Admiral Botel to receive their next clue. After finishing the Detour, teams were longer Intersected.

Additional tasks
At Petřín Hill, teams had to ride the Petřín funicular to the Petřín Hill Observation Tower, where they had to count the number of steps leading to the top of the tower and write the correct answer (299) on a board to receive their next clue.
At Střelecký Island, teams had to row a boat on the Vltava River in the direction of 140 degrees southwest, using a provided compass, to retrieve their clue.
At Ice Arena Letňany, each team member from the Intersected teams had to shoot one goal from three different points on the rink to receive their next clue.

Leg 9 (Czech Republic → Hungary)

Airdate: 24 January 2008
 Prague (Praha Hlavní Nádraží) to Budapest, Hungary (Budapest Keleti Railway Station)
Budapest (Batthyány Square)
Szentendre (Magyar Farm) 
 Visegrád (Fun Extreme Canopy)
Visegrád (Royal Palace – Hercules Fountain)
Visegrád (Salamon Tower ) 

This leg's Detour was a choice between Pitch or Pull. In Pitch, teams had to load a large pile of hay into a horse-drawn cart and then deliver it to a farmer to receive their clue. In Pull, teams had to milk a goat and obtain  of milk. After milking the goat, teams had to place her in a holding pen before delivering the milk to a farmer to receive their next clue.

In this leg's Roadblock, one team member had to ride ten sections of a flying fox course and add up several numbers found around the course to the correct total of 1,000 to receive their next clue. Only one racer could ride the flying fox at a time, and they would have to go to the back of any line formed by other racers if they gave an incorrect answer.

Additional task
After completing the Roadblock, teams had find the Hercules Fountain printed on a provided 1,000 forint bank note to find their next clue.

Additional note
At Batthyány Square, teams had to choose a marked Suzuki Swift car as their transportation for the rest of the leg.

Leg 10 (Hungary)

Airdate: 31 January 2008
Budapest (Little Princess Statue)
Budapest (Elisabeth Bridge) 
Budapest (Buda Castle – Budavári Labirintus) 
Budapest (Margaret Island – Resting Place of Saint Margaret)
Budapest (Heroes' Square)  
Budapest (Gellért Hill – Freedom Monument ) 

In this season's only Fast Forward, teams had to count the number of vertical bars on Elisabeth Bridge (2377) and then use the number obtained to open a safe with a four-digit combination. The first team to open the safe would win the Fast Forward award.

In this leg's Roadblock, one team member had to take a lantern and search through the dark and confusing labyrinth of tunnels beneath Buda Castle to search for the one out of several chests that contained their next clue.

This leg's Detour was a choice between Say It or Play It. In Say It, teams had to correctly pronounce, in a Hungarian accent, the names of fourteen prominent Hungarian rulers listed on the square's colonnade (Szent István király, Szent László, Könyves Kálmán, II. András, IV. Béla, Károly Róbert, Nagy Lajos, Hunyadi János, Hunyadi Mátyás, Bocskai István, Bethlen Gábor, Thököly Imre, II. Rákóczi Ferenc, and Kossuth Lajos) to receive their next clue. In Play It, teams had to solve a Rubik's Cube, but were given the option to solve one colour at a time for each of six sides and alternating between team members, to receive their next clue.

Additional task
At Margaret Island, teams had to travel by pedicab across the island and search for Saint Margaret's resting place. Once there, they had to retrieve a rabbit stuffed toy, a symbol of the island, and deliver it to the pedicab manager to receive their next clue.

Leg 11 (Hungary → South Africa)

Airdate: 7 February 2008
 Budapest (Budapest Ferihegy International Airport) to Cape Town, South Africa (Cape Town International Airport)
Cape Town (Signal Hill)
Cape Town (Killarney Motor Racing Complex) 
Khayelitsha (Intyatyambo Community Project)
Touws River (Aquila Private Game Reserve – Cheetah Enclosure) 
 Touws River (Aquila Private Game Reserve – Elephant Boma)
Touws River (Aquila Private Game Reserve – Stone Cottage) 

In this leg's Roadblock, one team member had to race eight laps around the Killarney racing circuit on a  open-wheel race car to receive their next clue from a race official. After four laps, they had to enter the pit area for a mandatory tune-up and if the team members entered it after seven minutes, they would incur a five-minute penalty.

This leg's Detour was a choice between In One End or Out The Other. In One End, teams had to prepare  of food and feed it to the elephants to receive their next clue. In Out The Other, teams had to clear an elephant enclosure of dung and move it a marked area, using only the tools provided, to receive their next clue from a ranger.

Additional tasks
At the summit of Signal Hill, teams had to search among several clue boxes for one containing their next clue.
At the Intyatyambo Community Project, teams had to collect painting supplies from a Standard Chartered pickup truck and paint a marked section of the community centre to receive their next clue, which contained a R34,500 (about US$5,000) cheque, courtesy of Standard Chartered, teams had to donate to the centre's caregivers before leaving.
At the Aquila Park Game Reserve, teams had to pick up their next clue, containing their Detour information, from inside a cheetah enclosure.

Leg 12 (South Africa → Singapore)

Airdate: 14 February 2008
Cape Town (District Six Museum)
 Cape Town (Victoria & Alfred Waterfront – The Scratch Patch or Master Wire and Bead Craft)
Cape Town (FC Kapstadt Soccer Pitch next to Green Point Stadium)
Atlantis (Atlantis Dunes)
 Cape Town (Cape Point)
 Cape Town (Cape Town International Airport) to Singapore (Changi Airport)
Singapore (Raffles' Landing Site)
Singapore (Sentosa – Tanjong Beach) 
Singapore (Chinese Garden – Rainbow Bridge) 

This season's final Detour was a choice between Search or Assemble (the latter was listed as "Sound" in teams' clues). In Search, teams had to go The Scratch Patch and search amongst thousands of semi-precious gemstones for three Amazing Race stones, which were yellow in colour with a red dot, that they could exchange for their next clue. In Assemble, teams had to go to Master Wire and Bead Craft and assemble a wire art radio using the tools provided to receive their next clue.

In this season's final Roadblock, one team member had pick the 10 flags representing the countries they visited out of a basket of 15, with the flags of Australia, Indonesia, Slovakia, United Kingdom, and Vanuatu as decoys, and arrange them in a circle and in chronological order: Singapore, Philippines, Hong Kong, New Zealand, Japan, South Korea, Germany, Czech Republic, Hungary, and South Africa. Once team members  got the correct order of correct flags, they could retrieve the final clue. 

Additional tasks
At District Six Museum, teams had to search for a Sony VAIO laptop and enter the name of a street of District Six as a password. When the correct street was entered, the next clue would direct them to read one paragraph from a designated marker before receiving their next clue.
At the field of the former Green Point Stadium adjacent to the future 2010 World Cup Stadium, teams had to score three goals against a goal keeper to receive their next clue.
At Atlantis Dunes, teams had to ride quad bikes along a marked course and search for their next clue hidden along the track beneath one of 18 marked areas with a bucket. The remaining 17 bucket contained hourglasses teams had to overturn and wait for the sand to run out before they could continue.
At Cape Point, after taking the funicular up to the summit, teams had to guess which was the next and final country, Singapore, to receive the next clue.

References

External links
Official website

Asia 2
2007 television seasons
2008 television seasons
Television shows filmed in Singapore
Television shows filmed in the Philippines
Television shows filmed in Hong Kong
Television shows filmed in New Zealand
Television shows filmed in Japan
Television shows filmed in South Korea
Television shows filmed in Germany
Television shows filmed in the Czech Republic
Television shows filmed in Hungary
Television shows filmed in South Africa